Crista Flanagan (born February 24, 1976) is an American actress and comedian, best known for her work as a cast member on the Fox sketch comedy series MADtv from 2005 to 2009, various roles in films made by Jason Friedberg and Aaron Seltzer, and her recurring role as Lois Sadler on the AMC series Mad Men.

Early life
Flanagan was born in Mount Vernon, Illinois, the daughter of Bonnie Jerdon and David Flanagan. She received a bachelor of science in theatre from the University of Evansville and a master of fine arts from the University of California, Irvine, where she sharpened her theatrical skills in plays including Fool for Love, The Time of Our Life, Cat on a Hot Tin Roof, The Marriage of Figaro, and Oklahoma!. Her extensive background in theater led to the development of Flanagan's one-person show titled But wait…I have Impressions!

Career

MADtv
Flanagan officially joined the cast of MADtv in 2005 as a featured performer, for the 10th season, then became a repertory cast member at the beginning of the following season. Her frequent impersonations were of Alex Hooser, Ellen Pompeo, Heidi Klum, Patricia Arquette (as Allison DuBois from Medium), Natalie Maines of the Dixie Chicks, and Miley Cyrus (as herself and as Hannah Montana from the Disney Channel show of the same name).

Crista had a long-standing gag with fellow cast member Bobby Lee, where their behind-the-scenes characters had a love/hate relationship.  This relationship can be seen in the "Secret Santa" skit, where Bobby proposes to Crista, to which she replies, "I cannot marry someone I have a restraining order against."  This can also be seen in the "Celebrity Triathlon" skit, where Crista slams the door after Bobby asks for her help, and she makes reference to not helping him dig up a dead body, but reluctantly agrees to help him train.

Characters

Impressions

 Alex Hooser
 America Ferrera
 Angela Cartwright
 Aaron Carter
 Cheryl Hines
 Elliot Page (then Ellen Page)  (as Juno MacGuff)
 Ellen Pompeo (as Meredith Grey)
 Emilie de Ravin (as Claire Littleton)
 Gilbert Gottfried
 Hayden Panettiere (as Claire Bennet)
 Heidi Klum
 Judy Reyes
 Kate Moss
 Khloé Kardashian
 Lindsay Lohan
 Lynne Spears
 Lo Bosworth
 Mary Murphy
 Meredith Vieira
 Michelle Ryan
 Miley Cyrus / Hannah Montana
 Natalie Horler in a loose parody of Cascada's "Everytime We Touch"
 Natalie Maines (of the Dixie Chicks)
 Patricia Arquette
 Scarlett Johansson
 Rachel McAdams
 Ron Howard (as Opie from The Andy Griffith Show)
 Tom Cruise
 Toni Basil
 Tracy Hutson
 Vanna White
 Vivian Vance (as Ethel Mertz from I Love Lucy)
 Whitney Port

After MADtv
After MADtv, Flanagan's most notable television role was the recurring role of Lois Sadler on the drama series Mad Men, on which she appeared for the first three seasons from 2007 to 2009. She has also appeared on Curb Your Enthusiasm, The Practice, and ER, and had a recurring role on You've Got a Friend (TV program). She partnered up with the team behind Ask a Ninja to create a video podcast called Hope is Emo. Flanagan played the role of Hermione Granger in the 2007 film, Epic Movie. She later appeared as Ugly Betty/Oracle in the "sequel" Meet the Spartans, and in Disaster Movie played Juney, a parody of Juno, and Hannah Montana/Miley Cyrus. She also appeared in Seltzer and Friedberg's 2010 project, Vampires Suck, as Eden Sullen. With the release of Best Night Ever in 2013, she became the most recurring actress in Jason Friedberg and Aaron Seltzer films. She posed nude in the August 2010 issue of Playboy.
She appeared in an episode of Big Time Rush as an evil producer named Kennedy.

Crista plays the title character in Hope Is Emo, an Internet comedy podcast that satirizes the life of a struggling emo girl named Hope. The series was created by Crista and the Ask a Ninja' team at Beatbox Giant Productions.

Filmography

Film

Television

References

External links

Suburban Blight Review (Crista Flanagan played Wilma)
TV.com  Crista Flanagan's TV roles and appearances

1976 births
Actresses from Illinois
American musical theatre actresses
American stand-up comedians
American television actresses
Living people
People from Mount Vernon, Illinois
University of California, Irvine alumni
University of Evansville alumni
American women comedians
21st-century American actresses
American sketch comedians
Comedians from Illinois
Comedians from California
21st-century American comedians
American impressionists (entertainers)